Centro Ybor (formerly known as Tampa Bay Federal Credit Union or Federal Credit Union) is a TECO Line streetcar station in historic Ybor City. The station has one island platform, located on a passing siding, that allows for trams to pass by each other on the single track line. Just west of the stations, there are two pedestrian overpasses over 8th Avenue that are part of the Centro Ybor complex.

Within walking distance

Centro Ybor
Ybor City Historic District
Centro Ybor Museum

See also

Light rail in the United States
List of streetcar systems in the United States
Streetcars in North America
Transportation in Florida

References

External links
 Official Website
 Station from Google Maps Street View

TECO Line Streetcar System stations
Railway stations in the United States opened in 2002
2002 establishments in Florida